Sandaowan is a town in Yanji, Yanbian, Jilin, China. It has a total population of 9944 and a total area of 555.7 sq km. It is divided into Canchang Community, Meikuang Community, Zhongxin Village, Wudao Village, Nanzhangzhi Village, Beizhangzhi Village, Donggou Village, Pinggang Village, Tuntian Village, Zhibian Village and Lishu Village.

References 

Yanji
Township-level divisions of Jilin